The 2000 Girabola was the 22nd season of top-tier football competition in Angola. The season ran from 18 March to 5 November 2000. Primeiro de Agosto were the defending champions.

The league comprised 14 teams, the bottom three of which were relegated to the 2001 Gira Angola.

Petro de Luanda were crowned champions, winning their 12th title, while ARA da Gabela, Sporting de Cabinda and Sporting do Bié, were relegated.

Blanchard of Benfica de Luanda finished as the top scorer with 19 goals.

Changes from the 1999 season
Relegated: Independente do Tômbwa and Progresso do Sambizanga  Withdrew: Cambondo de Malanje  Promoted: ARA da Gabela and Sporting do Bié
 Note: From this season on and up until 2009, the Girabola was contested by 14 teams, instead of 16.

League table

Results

Season statistics

Top scorer 
  Blanchard

Champions

References

External links
Girabola 2000 standings at girabola.com
Federação Angolana de Futebol

2000 in Angolan football
Girabola seasons
Angola
Angola